The year 1752 in science and technology involved some significant events.

Biology
 Establishment of Tiergarten Schönbrunn in Vienna, the world's oldest zoo.

Chemistry
 Thomas Melvill delivers a lecture entitled Observations on light and colours to the Medical Society of Edinburgh, a precursor of flame emission spectroscopy.
 Dmitry Ivanovich Vinogradov and Mikhail Lomonosov advertise the first hard-paste porcelain to be produced in Russia.

Mathematics
 Euler gives his formula for the number of faces, edges and vertices in a polyhedron.

Medicine
 Foundation of what will become the Manchester Royal Infirmary as a cottage hospital in Garden Street, Manchester, England, by Charles White (surgeon).
 John Pringle publishes Observations on the Diseases of the Army in Camp and Garrison in London, a pioneering text in modern military medicine.
 Approximate date – James Ayscough begins experimenting with tinted lenses in spectacles.

Physics
 Benjamin Franklin's kite experiment determines that lightning is an electrical phenomenon.

Awards
 Copley Medal: John Pringle

Births
 May 9 – Antonio Scarpa, Italian anatomist (died 1832)
 May 11 – Johann Friedrich Blumenbach, German physiologist and anthropologist (died 1840)
 July 6 – John Sheldon, English anatomist (died 1808)
 July 7 – Joseph Marie Jacquard, French inventor (died 1834)
 July 23 – Marc-Auguste Pictet, Swiss physicist (died 1825)
 September 18 – Adrien-Marie Legendre, French mathematician (died 1833)
 Pierre Joseph Bonnaterre, French naturalist (died 1804)

Deaths
 January 4 – Gabriel Cramer, Genevan mathematician (born 1704)
 February 9 – Frederik Hasselquist, Swedish traveller and naturalist (born 1722)
 April 10 – William Cheselden, surgeon (born 1688)

References

 
18th century in science
1750s in science